David Munson could refer to: 

David Curtiss Munson (1884-1953), American track and field athlete
Dave Munson (born 1942), American politician and former mayor of Sioux Falls, South Dakota
David C. Munson, American academic

See also
David Manson (disambiguation)
David Monson (disambiguation)